Christian, Duke of Oldenburg (born 1 February 1955) is the head of the Grand Ducal Family of Oldenburg which is a side line of the House of Schleswig-Holstein-Gottorp, the latter being one of several branches of the larger House of Oldenburg.

Family and life
Christian was born in Rastede, Lower Saxony, the only son of Duke Anton-Günther of Oldenburg and his wife Princess Ameli of Löwenstein-Wertheim-Freudenberg (b. 1923). Christian has an elder sister, Duchess Helene (b. 1953) who is unmarried. Christian has a diploma in Business.

Christian is a great-grandson of the last Grand Duke of Oldenburg to reign, Frederick Augustus II and through his mother he is related to the Princes of Löwenstein-Wertheim-Freudenberg, who belong to a morganatic branch of the House of Wittelsbach descending from Frederick I, Elector Palatine.

Christian became heir to the headship of the Grand Ducal family on 3 April 1970 when his grandfather Hereditary Grand Duke Nikolaus died. Under the monarchy the Grand Duke and the Hereditary Grand Duke and their wives were entitled to the style Royal Highness, the other members of the House of Oldenburg to the style Highness. First as heir to the headship of the House and now head of the House Christian bears this style. According to his father's obituary issued by the family his ancestral titles (however not all part of his official German surname) are: HRH The Duke of Oldenburg, Heir in Norway, Duke of Schleswig, Holstein, Stormarn, Dithmarschen and Oldenburg, Prince of Lübeck and Birkenfeld, Lord of Jever and Knyphausen.

The ancestral home of the House of Oldenburg is Oldenburg castle, nowadays a museum owned by the state. Present seats of the Duke of Oldenburg are Rastede Palace near Oldenburg and Güldenstein Manor, Harmsdorf, in Schleswig-Holstein. Eutin Castle in Schleswig-Holstein is a museum owned by a family foundation set up by his father.

Marriage and children
Christian married on 26 September 1987 at Pronstorf Countess Caroline zu Rantzau (b. 1962), daughter of Count Christian Karl zu Rantzau (1924-2002) and his wife Héloise von Lettow-Vorbeck (b. 1923). They have four children:
Duke Alexander Paul Hans-Caspar Andreas Daniel Carl Philippe of Oldenburg (born 17 March 1990 in Lübeck) 
Duke Philipp Konstantin Wittekind Raimund Clemens Hans-Heinrich of Oldenburg (born 28 December 1991 in Lübeck)
Duke Anton Friedrich Ludwig Jan Vincent of Oldenburg (born 9 January 1993 in Lübeck)
Duchess Katharina Bibiane Edwina Isabell of Oldenburg (born 20 February 1997 in Lübeck)

Ancestry

Notes

References

External links

 Website of the Herzoglich Oldenburgische Verwaltung (Ducal Oldenburgian Administration) at Güldenstein (with image of Duke Christian)

1955 births
Living people
People from Lübeck
Dukes of Oldenburg